Events in the year 1991 in Japan. It corresponds to Heisei 3 (平成3年) in the Japanese calendar.

Incumbents 
 Emperor: Akihito
 Prime Minister: Toshiki Kaifu (L–Aichi) until November 5, Kiichi Miyazawa 
 Chief Cabinet Secretary: Misoji Sakamoto (L–Ishikawa) until November 5, Kōichi Katō (L–Yamagata)
 Chief Justice of the Supreme Court: Ryōhachi Kusaba
 President of the House of Representatives: Yoshio Sakurauchi (L–Shimane)
 President of the House of Councillors: Yoshihiko Tsuchiya (L–Saitama) until October 4, Yūji Osada (L–proportional)
 Diet sessions: 120th (regular session opened in December 1990, to May 8), 121st (extraordinary, August 5 to October 4), 122nd (extraordinary, November 5 to December 21)

Governors
Aichi Prefecture: Reiji Suzuki 
Akita Prefecture: Kikuji Sasaki 
Aomori Prefecture: Masaya Kitamura 
Chiba Prefecture: Takeshi Numata 
Ehime Prefecture: Sadayuki Iga 
Fukui Prefecture: Yukio Kurita
Fukuoka Prefecture: Hachiji Okuda 
Fukushima Prefecture: Eisaku Satō
Gifu Prefecture: Taku Kajiwara 
Gunma Prefecture: Ichiro Shimizu (until 12 June); Hiroyuki Kodera (starting 28 July) 
Hiroshima Prefecture: Toranosuke Takeshita 
Hokkaido: Takahiro Yokomichi 
Hyogo Prefecture: Toshitami Kaihara 
Ibaraki Prefecture: Fujio Takeuchi 
Ishikawa Prefecture: Yōichi Nakanishi 
Iwate Prefecture:   (until 29 April); Iwao Kudō (starting 29 April)
Kagawa Prefecture: Jōichi Hirai 
Kagoshima Prefecture: Yoshiteru Tsuchiya 
Kanagawa Prefecture: Kazuji Nagasu 
Kochi Prefecture: Chikara Nakauchi (until 6 December); Daijiro Hashimoto (starting 7 December) 
Kumamoto Prefecture: Morihiro Hosokawa (until 10 February); Joji Fukushima (starting 11 February)
Kyoto Prefecture: Teiichi Aramaki 
Mie Prefecture: Ryōzō Tagawa 
Miyagi Prefecture: Shuntarō Honma 
Miyazaki Prefecture: Suketaka Matsukata 
Nagano Prefecture: Gorō Yoshimura 
Nagasaki Prefecture: Isamu Takada 
Nara Prefecture: Shigekiyo Ueda (until 27 November); Yoshiya Kakimoto (starting 28 November)
Niigata Prefecture: Kiyoshi Kaneko 
Oita Prefecture: Morihiko Hiramatsu 
Okayama Prefecture: Shiro Nagano 
Okinawa Prefecture: Masahide Ōta
Osaka Prefecture: Sakae Kishi (until 22 April); Kazuo Nakagawa (starting 23 April)
Saga Prefecture: Kumao Katsuki (until 22 April); Isamu Imoto (starting 23 April)
Saitama Prefecture: Yawara Hata 
Shiga Prefecture: Minoru Inaba 
Shiname Prefecture: Nobuyoshi Sumita 
Shizuoka Prefecture: Shigeyoshi Saitō 
Tochigi Prefecture: Fumio Watanabe
Tokushima Prefecture: Shinzo Miki 
Tokyo: Shun'ichi Suzuki 
Tottori Prefecture: Yuji Nishio 
Toyama Prefecture: Yutaka Nakaoki
Wakayama Prefecture: Shirō Kariya  
Yamagata Prefecture: Seiichirō Itagaki 
Yamaguchi Prefecture: Toru Hirai 
Yamanashi Prefecture: Kōmei Mochizuki (until 16 February); Ken Amano (starting 17 February)

Events 
 January 1: Telephone numbers in Tokyo are expanded from 7 digits to 8 digits
 March 14: A under constructing to Hiroshima Astram Line bridge girder falling accident, kills 14, injures 9.
 April 1: Tokyo Metropolitan Government moved its offices from Marunouchi to the Tokyo Metropolitan Government Building in Shinjuku.
 April 26: Self-Defense Forces dispatched to assist in the Gulf War.
 May 14: Shigaraki train disaster – 42 fatalities, 614 injures in Shiga Prefecture.
 June 3: Mount Unzen in Nagasaki Prefecture saw a pyroclastic flow, resulting in 43 deaths.
 June 15: The International Olympic Committee awards the 1998 Winter Olympics to Nagano, Japan.
 June 20: Tohoku Shinkansen line is extended from Ueno Station to Tokyo Station.
 July 13: 1991 Itoman special breach of trust case, six arrested by Japanese authorities.
 July 31: Lotte Orions baseball team announces it will move to Chiba and become the Chiba Lotte Marines.
 August 5: Aerospatiale SA365N helicopter crash in Muraoka, Mikata District, Hyōgo Prefecture, 8 fatalities.
 August 14 – NTT Docomo was founded.
 September 11:  is based at Yokosuka, becoming the United States Navy's only forward-deployed aircraft carrier.
 September 27: Typhoon Mireille kills 45 people in Japan.
 October 3: Kaifu resigns as prime minister.
 November 5: Miyazawa announces his first cabinet.

Births

January 
 January 8: Asuka Hinoi, singer
 January 14: Kana Ichikawa, sprinter
 January 19: Yu Takahashi, model and actress

February 
 February 4: Aya Ōmasa, fashion model and actress

March 
 March 4: Aoi Nakamura, actor
 March 10: Kenshi Yonezu, singer-songwriter
 March 14: Michiko Kashiwabara, cross country skier
 March 14: Miu Nakamura, tarento and gravure idol
 March 15: Kii Kitano, gravure idol and actress
 March 28: Rin Asuka, actress

April 
 April 8: Minami Takahashi, singer
 April 11: Erina Mano, J-pop singer
 April 11: Kenta Matsudaira, table tennis player
 April 12: Daisuke Kikuchi, footballer
 April 15: Daiki Arioka, singer
 April 16: Misato Ugaki, announcer
 April 17: Shinsaku Uesugi, FIDE master
 April 20: Yuko Shintake, artistic gymnast
 April 29: Misaki Doi, tennis player
 May 3: Narita Brian, racehorse (died 1998)

May 
 May 24: Erika Umeda, singer
 May 26: Takumi Abe, football player
 May 29: Saori Hayami, voice actress and singer

June 
 June 15: Rina Takeda, actress and martial artist
 June 17: Yusei Kikuchi, baseball pitcher
 June 25: Kyousuke Hamao, actor and model
 June 27: Haruka Yamazaki, voice actress and singer
 June 30: Kaho, actress

July 
 July 3: Tomomi Itano, singer, actress and idol
 July 10: Atsuko Maeda, singer
 July 11: Kentaro Sakaguchi, model and actor 
 July 12: Tomoki Kameda, boxer
 July 15: Yuki Kashiwagi, singer, actress and idol
 July 18: Mizuki Yamamoto, model and actress
 July 25: Miyu Nagaoka, volleyball player
 July 27: Rena Matsui, singer and idol
 July 28: Rina Aizawa, actress

August 
 August 3: Kaori Kawanaka, archer
 August 16: Yūki Tokiwa, voice actor

September 
 September 17: Ryo Ishikawa, golfer

October 
 October 15: Sayaka Nakaya, idol
 October 16: Miori Takimoto, actress
 October 23: Princess Mako
 October 26: Riho Iida, actress and child model
 October 27: Sōta Murakami, actor and voice actor

November 
 November 12: Takatoshi Abe, track and field athlete
 November 16: Tomomi Kasai, singer
 November 19: Genki Yamamoto, cyclist
 November 22: Saki Shimizu, singer
 November 26: Yoshi Tsutsugo, professional baseball player
 November 28: Mayuko Kawakita, actress and model

December 
 December 3: Masahiro Usui, actor
 December 7: Dori Sakurada, actor and singer
December 14: Mitsuki Takahata, actress and singer  
December 19: Sumire Uesaka, voice actress and singer
 December 24: Shion Kokubun, figure skater
 December 30: Kurumi Nara, tennis player

Deaths 
 January 2: Hiroshi Noma, author (b. 1915)
 January 29: Yasushi Inoue, author (b. 1907)
 February 24: Shingo Kanemoto, voice actor (b. 1932)
 May 15: Shintaro Abe, politician (b. 1924)
 May 26: Kisaburo Osawa, aikido teacher (b. 1910)
 June 3: Takeshi Nagata, earth scientist (b. 1913)
 July 5: Nobuo Nakamura, actor (b. 1908)
 July 11: Hitoshi Igarashi, scholar (b. 1947)
 August 5: Soichiro Honda, founder of Honda Motor Company (b. 1906)
 August 8: Mitsuko Yoshikawa, actress (b. 1901)
 September 3: Susumu Ishii, second kaicho (Godfather) of Inagawa-kai (b. 1924)
 October 22: Hachiro Kasuga, enka singer (b. 1924)
 November 12: Keizō Hayashi, civil servant and military general (b. 1907)
 November 14: Yoshikata Yoda, screenwriter (b. 1909)
 November 23: Ken Uehara, film actor (b. 1909)
 November 27: Yō Yoshimura, voice actor (b. 1909)

Statistics 
Yen value: US$1 = ¥124.85 (December 31)

See also 
 1991 in Japanese television
 List of Japanese films of 1991

References 

 
1991 in Asia
Years of the 20th century in Japan
Japan